The Linden Park Place-Belle Avenue Historic District is a residential historic district in Highland Park, Illinois. The district includes 34 houses along Linden Park Place, Park Avenue, Linden Avenue, Elm Place, Park Lane, and Belle Avenue. The district includes the work of noteworthy architects such as George W. Maher and Robert Seyfarth. It also includes several homes built from pattern books during the first wave of Highland Park's development in the 1870s. Architectural styles present in the district include Victorian Gothic, Italianate, and Prairie School.

The district was added to the National Register of Historic Places on December 13, 1983.

References

		
.

National Register of Historic Places in Lake County, Illinois
Historic districts on the National Register of Historic Places in Illinois
Highland Park, Illinois